Bradley House or variants thereof may refer to:

In England

 Bradley (house), a medieval manor house in Devon
 Bradley House, Wiltshire, a historic house in Wiltshire

In the United States

 Bradley-Hubbell House, a historic house in Easton, Connecticut
 Bradley–Wheeler House, a historic house in Westport, Connecticut
 Dan Bradley House, a historic house in Marcellus, New York
 Bradley House (Midland, Michigan), a historic house and museum
 Radka–Bradley House, a historic house and museum in Rogers City, Michigan
 J.D.C. Bradley House, a historic house in Southborough, Massachusetts
 J. S. Bradley House, Portland, Oregon, listed on the National Register of Historic Places
 Harold C. Bradley House, a historic house in Madison, Wisconsin
 B. Harley Bradley House, a historic house in Kankakee, Illinois, designed by Frank Lloyd Wright

See also
 Bradley Octagon House, a historic house in Niagara Falls, Ontario